Three and Out is a 2008 British black comedy film directed by Jonathan Gershfield and starring Mackenzie Crook, Colm Meaney, Gemma Arterton, Imelda Staunton, and Kerry Katona. It premiered in London on the 21 April 2008 and was released in the UK and Ireland on 25 April 2008. It was released in Australia under the title A Deal Is a Deal.

Plot
Paul Callow (Mackenzie Crook) accidentally runs a man over with his underground train, after the man is pulled on to the tracks by his dog. After a week off he kills a second passenger who falls onto the tracks after having a heart attack.

Before taking time off for the second accident his colleagues tell him about a little-known 'rule' at London Underground that no-one talks about: three 'under' within a month, and you lose your job - earning yourself ten years' salary in one lump sum. But being off for the next week means that Paul needs to find someone willing to kill themselves by the following Monday.

Paul sets about trying to find someone prepared to die under his train – and after hearing a report about Holborn Viaduct he comes across Tommy Cassidy (Colm Meaney) attempting to jump off. He grabs his hand and pulls him up but far from being grateful Tommy is angered by Paul's interference and moans about how "do gooders" will not just mind their own business, however upon hearing a police siren he agrees to get in Paul's car.

While in a bar Paul explains to Tommy that he will pay him if he is willing to jump in front of his train. Tommy is scornful asking what good will the money do him if he has to die. Paul says that he can have one last weekend of fun. Tommy however wants to do something meaningful.

Tommy agrees to his proposal and decides to spend his last weekend making amends with his estranged family.

Tommy hires a car and they travel to Liverpool. While there they find that Tommy's wife Rosemary (Imelda Staunton) and daughter Frances (Gemma Arterton) have moved to the Lake District. Paul tags along to protect his investment.

While in the Lake District Tommy meets with resistance from his wife and daughter. He reconciles with his wife, who reveals she has found a new man. Paul meets the daughter at a local pub and the two get drunk and sleep together.

On the Sunday morning Tommy tries to talk to his daughter and sees her in bed with Paul, then chases him over some hills before having a mild cardiac attack and being taken to hospital. Tommy and Paul leave to go back to London.

Paul tells Tommy he does not want to kill him and Tommy insists that he go through with it. On the Monday morning Paul is told by his colleagues that the "three and out" rule was a joke, and that there is no pay off. When the time approaches Paul sees Tommy on the tracks and stops and reports an "animal on the tracks".  However, crying and recalling "a deal's a deal", Paul accelerates towards Tommy, who recites William Butler Yeats' poem Lake Isle of Innisfree as the train kills him.

Distraught, Paul sits at home then begins to write and changes the title of his novel to Three and Out, we see Frances receive a copy of the novel along with £10,000 which Paul had promised to Tommy. Hidden behind the cheque is the dedication "In Memory of Tommy Cassidy".  Realising her Dad has died, Frankie breaks down in tears.  She travels to London and meets Paul, they go deep sea diving with Great White Sharks, Tommy's last wish.

Cast
 Mackenzie Crook as Paul
 Colm Meaney as Tommy
 Gemma Arterton as Frankie
 Imelda Staunton as Rosemary
 Antony Sher as Maurice
 Kerry Katona as Mary
 Gary Lewis as Callaghan
 Annette Badland as Maureen
 Mark Benton as Vic
 Rhashan Stone as Ash
 Sharon Duncan-Brewster as Yvonne
 Frank Dunne as Danny
 Steve Money as Muscles
 Rob Witcomb as Gary
 Dean Lennox Kelly as Policeman

Production
Although set around the London Underground, most of the action in the film takes place above ground and in North London, Liverpool and Cumbria.

A scene set in South Africa was filmed in Gibraltar.

Controversy
The film, whose filming was carried out in close co-operation with London Underground, has been the cause of controversy due to the plot of the film involving a character seeking someone to commit suicide by diving under his train.  Before the film was released, the train drivers' union, ASLEF, called the plot "insulting and foolish" despite not having seen the film and have pointed out that train drivers who experience such incidents find them "life-changing traumas". The union organized a protest at premiere of the film, handing out leaflets to the public, from whom it claims to have received strong support.  The filmmakers' spokesperson stated that "difficult issues portrayed in the film have been handled sensitively."

Reception

Box office
Three and Out flopped, entered at number 12 in the UK box office chart with an opening weekend take of £189,454.

Critical response
The film was panned by critics, with criticism focused on the script, direction and overuse of crude humour. On Rotten Tomatoes it has a 17% rating  based on 6 reviews.

Awards
2009
 Oxford International Film Festival - Won - Best Screenplay
 Oxford International Film Festival - Nominated - Best Narrative Feature
 Method Fest Independent Film Festival - Won - The Stella Artois Award for Best Foreign Film 2009
 Method Fest Independent Film Festival - Won - Colm Meaney - Stockholm Krystal Best Supporting Actor—Feature Film 2009
 California Independent Film Festival - Won- Best Comedy
 California Independent Film Festival - Won - Best Actress - Imelda Staunton
 Durango Film Festival - Won - Audience Award - Best Feature Film
 Durango Film Festival - Won - Jury Award - Best Feature Film
 Tallahassee Film Festival - Won - Best Narrative Feature
 Garden State Film Festival - Won - International Feature Length Comedy
 Honolulu International Festival - Won - Special Mention - Outstanding Directorial Achievement in Motion Pictures
 Palm Springs International Film Festival - Official Selection 2009

2008
 Southern Appalachian International Film Festival - Won - Best Comedy or Musical
 São Paulo International Film Festival - Nominated - International Jury Award
 Fort Lauderdale International Film Festival - Official Selection 2008

Home media
Contender Entertainment Group have released this film on Region 2 DVD on 15 September 2008 in The United Kingdom.  The extra features included cast & crew biographies, deleted scenes, trailers and a featurette on the making of this film.  It was rated as a 12 certificate and has a distinct sticker on the front saying Gemma Arterton as the new Bond Girl being in this film.  Gemma appears as Agent Fields in the 22nd James Bond film Quantum of Solace.

Soundtrack
The trailer features the tracks "Dreaming of You" by The Coral, "One Way or Another" by Blondie, "Spirit in the Sky" by Norman Greenbaum and "Night Time" by N.U.M.B. There is a soundtrack of the same name accompanying this film.

Novelisation
The novelisation of Three and Out by Tom Henry was released on 14 April 2008 by Rovinge Publishing Company Limited. It is based on the original screenplay by Steve Lewis and Tony Owen and provides a great deal of additional information on the characters' lives as well as answering a number of questions not resolved by the film.

References

External links
 
 
 
 Simon Weller, a train driver, on the movie.

2008 black comedy films
2008 films
2008 comedy-drama films
British black comedy films
British comedy-drama films
Films about suicide
Films shot in Cumbria
Films scored by Trevor Jones
Films set in London
Films set on the London Underground
Films shot in Liverpool
2000s English-language films
2000s British films